Parlon is an Irish surname. Notable people with the surname include:

 Cathal Parlon (21st century), Irish hurler
 Tom Parlon (born 1953), Irish politician

See also
 Pardon (name)

Surnames of Irish origin